was a lieutenant general in the Imperial Japanese Army. He was involved in the Pacific War and the Second Sino-Japanese War.  He was a recipient of the Order of the Rising Sun, first class, large cordon.

Life

Early life
Ichirō Banzai was born on January 26, 1891, in Kurosaki village in what was later the city of Hino, Tottori. He was the son of Inada Kiyoaki, a third-class combat medic in the Imperial Japanese Army. He was later adopted by Lieutenant General Banzai Rihachirō, whom he assumed the surname of. He attended Yonago Middle School (now Yonago Higher School), Osaka Army Youth School, and the Army Youth School, from which he graduated from in 1911.

Military career
In May 1919, Banzai worked in the Imperial Japanese Army General Staff Office (German class). He served as a member of the General Staff and as a military attaché to Germany. From February 1923 to June 1926, he was attached to the Japanese Embassy in Berlin. After returning to Japan, he served as an instructor at the Imperial Japanese Army Academy, as well as a member of the General Staff. He was assigned to the Inspectorate General of Military Training. From February 1932 to March 1934, he returned to Germany again as a military attaché.

After returning to Japan, Banzai was assigned to the Imperial Japanese Army Weapons Factory. In August 1934, he was promoted to colonel and served as the leader of the investigation squad of the Ministry of the Army. He was a member of the General Staff of both the Imperial Japanese Army and the Kwantung Army (Chief of the First Section). He was the commander of the 59th Infantry Company. In July 1938, he was promoted to the rank of major general. He continued to be an instructor and an officer at the IJAA, as well as being appointed commandant of the Army Infantry School. In November 1940, he was re-appointed to the Japanese embassy in Berlin. He left Tokyo in January of the following year and returned to Japan in January 1943. In March 1941, while he was in Germany, he was promoted to the rank of lieutenant general.

In February 1943, Banzai was appointed the commander of the IJA 35th Division, a garrison division which participated rear guard actions in the Taihang Mountains of China during the Second Sino-Japanese War. In April 1944, he was promoted to commander of the IJA 20th Army provide a garrison force for areas left under defended by the movement of troops further south in Operation Ichi-Go. From April 9, 1945 – June 7, 1945 it carried out the offensive in the Battle of West Hunan, the last major Japanese offensive of the Second Sino-Japanese War, during which time it suffered significant casualties.  After the surrender of Japan, the IJA 20th Army surrendered to ROC General Wang Yaowu in a classroom on the second floor of the Science building of Hunan University in Changsha.  However, the army was not immediately demobilized, but was rearmed by the Kuomintang government of the Republic of China and was assigned to the maintenance of public order until it was officially disbanded on July 15, 1946 at Hengyang, Hunan province. General Ichirō Banzai died in Shanghai less than a month after the surrender at Shanghai on September 16, 1945 at the age of 54.

Court ranks
September 15, 1941 – Junior 4th Rank
October 1, 1943 – Senior 4th Rank

Family
Wife – Banzai Hayae, daughter of Banzai Rihachirō 
Brother – Inaba Mazasumi, IJA Lieutenant General
Son-in-law – Kurokawa Nobuo, Army Major

Notes

References 

Imperial Japanese Army generals of World War II
1891 births
1945 deaths
Military personnel from Tottori Prefecture
People of the Second Sino-Japanese War